Stretton-on-Dunsmore is a village and civil parish in the English county of Warwickshire. Its population in the 2001 Census was recorded as 1,143, rising slightly to 1,159 at the 2011 Census. In the 19th century the population was 634. The village is situated just south of the A45 road, approximately midway between Rugby and Coventry. Administratively, Stretton is part of the borough of Rugby. Stretton means "settlement on a Roman Road" (from the Old English stræt and tun). In this case the road is Fosse Way. This site is referred to in the Domesday Book.

History
In the reign of William the Conqueror the manor of Stratone on Dunsmore was owned by Roger de Montgomery. It was five hides in area and possessed an ancient mill called Purmulne, later called Pirrey Mill, which was given to the monks of Coombe Abbey by Robert de Chetwolde. The title Lord of the Manor of Stratone on Dunsmore is an old Norman title dating from 1086. In the reign of Edward I the manor was sold by Thomas Garshale to Robert de Herig, who soon afterwards sold it to Henry de Hastings for 30 silver marks and a pair of white gloves or 1d paid annually at Easter. 

It was afterwards held by the Bray family and through marriage to Henry Starkey who sold it to Lady Longvile. In 1620 it was purchased by Richard Taylor of Binley. The current title, recognized in law under the Law of Property Act 1925, is held by Niel Morley: Lord of Stretton on Dunsmore. In 1915 King George V reviewed the troops of the 29th Division on the London Road (now the A45) just north of the village before they were sent to Gallipoli. A large Portland stone obelisk on a roundabout of the A45 commemorates the review.

Parish church
The parish church of All Saints formerly contained a chantry chapel founded by Thomas de Wolvardynton, Parson of Lobenham in Leicestershire. He "bequeathed monies for two priests to sing Mass daily at the altar of St Thomas the Martyr for the good estates of himself and the Earl of Huntington". Edward III granted to the founders of the chantry chapel "four acres of meadow land, three acres of wood and 20 pounds rent per annum". In the reign of Richard II licence was granted to Robert de Stretton, then Bishop of Coventry and Lichfield, land and rents so that "a priest sing Mass daily in the chapel for the good estate of the King and for the health of his soul when he should depart this life, and for the soul of the King's father and grandfather." It is thought that the Bishop took his name from Stretton, having first been a Canon of Lichfield and Chaplain to the Black Prince, Richard II's father.

Notable people 
Land drainage reformer Joseph Elkington was baptised at Stretton in 1740 and farmed nearby.

Sources

Stretton on Dunsmore: The Making of a Warwickshire Village. (2000). Stretton Millennium History Group. . 167pp.

References 
See The National Archives - Stretton on Fosse, Warwickshire     Folio:   244r Great Domesday Book.  Copy held on the Public Record in the National Archives, Kew. Dated 1086AD

External links

Stretton-on-Dunsmore official website
Stretton-on-Dunsmore history society

Villages in Warwickshire
Civil parishes in Warwickshire